Dielman Kolb Homestead is a historic home located at 331 Kinsey Road, near Lederach in Lower Salford Township, Montgomery County, Pennsylvania.  The house was built in 1717, and is a -story, gambrel roofed dwelling with a modified Germanic floor plan.  It has an attached summer kitchen.

It was added to the National Register of Historic Places in 1973.

References

Houses on the National Register of Historic Places in Pennsylvania
Houses completed in 1717
Houses in Montgomery County, Pennsylvania
National Register of Historic Places in Montgomery County, Pennsylvania
1717 establishments in Pennsylvania